The 2020 NCAA Division II men's basketball tournament was to be the annual single-elimination tournament to determine the national champion of men's NCAA Division II college basketball in the United States. With a field of sixty-four teams, it was supposed to begin on March 16 and conclude with the championship game on April 5.

As with the prior year's format, the eight regional winners would have met in the Elite Eight for the quarterfinal, semifinal, and championship rounds. The quarterfinal and semifinal rounds were scheduled to take place again at the Ford Center in Evansville, Indiana, while the championship final was due to take place at State Farm Arena in Atlanta, Georgia so as to coincide with the Division I Final Four.

After the announcement of the tournament field on March 8, the entire tournament was cancelled on March 12 due to the ongoing coronavirus pandemic.

Qualification
A total of sixty-four bids were available for the tournament: 21 automatic bids (awarded to the champions of the twenty-one Division II conferences) and 41 at-large bids.

The bids are allocated evenly among the eight NCAA-designated regions (Atlantic, Central, East, Midwest, South, South Central, Southeast, and West), each of which contains either two or three of the twenty-three Division II conferences that sponsor men's basketball (after the Heartland Conference disbanded in 2019, the South Region now features only two conferences). Each region consists of two or three automatic qualifiers (the teams who won their respective conference tournaments) and either five or six at-large bids, awarded regardless of conference affiliation.

Regionals

Atlantic

* – Denotes overtime period

Central

* – Denotes overtime period

East

* – Denotes overtime period

Midwest

South

Southeast

* – Denotes overtime period

South Central

West

See also
2020 NCAA Division II women's basketball tournament
2020 NCAA Division I men's basketball tournament
2020 NCAA Division III men's basketball tournament
2020 NAIA Division I men's basketball tournament
2020 NAIA Division II men's basketball tournament

References 

 2019 Division II Men's Basketball Official Bracket

Tournament
NCAA Division II
NCAA Division II men's basketball tournament
NCAA Division II men's basketball tournament, 2020
2020 in sports in Indiana
2020 in sports in Georgia (U.S. state)